Pushprajgarh tehsil (पुष्पराजगढ़) is a fourth-order administrative and revenue division, a subdivision of third-order administrative and revenue division of Anuppur district (अनूपपुर) of Madhya Pradesh. This tehsil contains Amarkantak, the source of the Narmada and a popular pilgrimage site.

Geography
It is bounded by Umaria district in the northwest, Shahdol district in the north, northeast, Jaithari tehsil  in the east, Chhattisgarh in the southeast, Dindori district in the south, southwest and west.

Demographics 
At the time of the 2011 census, Pushparajgarh tehsil has a population of 230,005. Scheduled Castes and Scheduled Tribes make up 7.19% and 76.84% of the population respectively. 94.82% of the population speaks Hindi and 3.53% Gondi as their first language. The local dialect of Hindi is a mix of Bagheli and Chhattisgarhi.

See also 
Anuppur district

References 

Tehsils of Madhya Pradesh
Anuppur district